The 1986 Amstel Gold Race was the 21st edition of the annual road bicycle race "Amstel Gold Race", held on Saturday April 26, 1986, in the Dutch province of Limburg. The race covered 242 kilometres, from Heerlen to Meerssen. There were 154 competitors, and 51 cyclists finished the race.

Result

External links
Results

Amstel Gold Race
April 1986 sports events in Europe
1986 in road cycling
1986 in Dutch sport
1986 Super Prestige Pernod International